Damien Miceli (born 17 October 1984) is a Belgian football player, who currently plays for WS Woluwe FC.

Career
The left midfielder previously played for MVV in the Dutch Eerste Divisie and Charleroi in the Belgian First Division.

References

1984 births
Living people
Belgian footballers
Association football midfielders
Belgian Pro League players
Eerste Divisie players
R. Charleroi S.C. players
MVV Maastricht players
Sportspeople from Charleroi
Footballers from Hainaut (province)